Dianne Christine McCarthy  is a New Zealand scientist and professional director, who was the chief executive of the Royal Society of New Zealand between 2007 and 2014. She lives in Blenheim.

Education 
McCarthy completed a Bachelor of Arts degree in mathematics and music, followed by a Master of Science degree at the University of Auckland. She also completed a PhD in experimental psychology at the university in 1979. The title of her doctoral thesis was A behavioural analysis of signal-detection performance.

Professional life 
McCarthy has held a number of senior management and governance roles in the tertiary education, science and health sectors. She is a former professor and pro vice-chancellor of the University of Auckland, and served as the chief executive of the Royal Society of New Zealand from 2007 to 2014, after two terms on the society's council from 2000 to 2007.

She has published scientific literature in the area of behavioural neuroscience and lectured in this area at the University of Auckland from 1981, becoming head of the department of psychology in 1991. In 1995 she was promoted to professor and served as associate dean of the university's Faculty of Medical and Health Sciences.

She currently sits on a number of company boards, including Powerhouse Ventures Ltd, the Cawthron Institute, and is a member of the governance boards of the Dodd-Walls Centre for Photonic and Quantum Technologies, the Healthier Lives National Science Challenge. She is also acting chair of the Ageing Well National Science Challenge. She is a trustee of the Malaghan Institute of Medical Research and the Hearing Research Foundation (NZ), and is a member of the Science Advisory Board of the Centre for Brain Research at the University of Auckland. She was recently appointed to the Board of the New Zealand Institute of Economic Research.

Advocacy for women 
McCarthy was co-opted onto the Royal Society of New Zealand council to improve representation of women. According to the official Royal Society of New Zealand history, Illuminating Our World, McCarthy found the Society "rather inward looking, with little engagement and established in its ways".

While chief executive of the Royal Society, McCarthy helped to establish the New Zealand Women in Leadership programme that helped women in tertiary institutions to become leaders. She has been interested in equity issues throughout her career, being appointed as pro vice-chancellor of equal opportunities at the University of Auckland in 2005. She has served as a New Zealand judge for the L'Oréal-UNESCO For Women in Science Awards.

Honours 
McCarthy was appointed an Officer of the New Zealand Order of Merit, for services to education, in the 2008 Queen's Birthday Honours, and a Companion of the Royal Society of New Zealand for her services to science in 2015. In the 2016 Queen's Birthday Honours, she was promoted to Companion of the New Zealand Order of Merit, for her services to science, business and women. When she was awarded the honour, she said she wanted to let young women know that science is not just for boys.

References 

New Zealand women scientists
Royal Society of New Zealand
University of Auckland alumni
Academic staff of the University of Auckland
New Zealand psychologists
New Zealand women psychologists
Living people
Companions of the New Zealand Order of Merit
People associated with the Cawthron Institute
Companions of the Royal Society of New Zealand
Year of birth missing (living people)